Six Mile is an unincorporated community in Floyd County, in the U.S. state of Georgia.

History
An early variant name was "Courtesy".

References

Unincorporated communities in Floyd County, Georgia
Unincorporated communities in Georgia (U.S. state)